= Abel Ndeh Sanjou-Tadzong =

- Born: Abel Ndeh Sanjou-Tadzong mankon, Bamenda
- Citizenship: Cameroon
- Education: Université Officielle du Congo (Lubumbashi); Université Nationale du Zaïre (Kinshasa)
- Occupations: Educator; Public administrator; Author
- Known for: Former Government Delegate (Mayor) of the Bamenda Urban Council; Author of *Community Stewardship*
- Spouse: Esther Anwi Mofor

Abel Ndeh Sanjou-Tadzong is a Cameroonian educator, former government delegate (mayor) of the then-defunct urban council of Bamenda, and author. He is known for his long service as Government Delegate for Bamenda city, his background in biology teaching and pedagogic inspection, and for his memoir-style book *Community Stewardship* (2021).

== Early life and education ==
Abel Ndeh Sanjou-Tadzong was born in Mankon, a locality in Bamenda, Cameroon, to Pa Moses Nche Sanjou and Mama Martha Manka'ah Tadzong. He studied Biology and Botany (specializing in Plant Taxonomy) at the Université Officielle du Congo (Lubumbashi) and the Université Nationale du Zaïre (Kinshasa campus).

== Career ==
=== Academic and educational career ===
After his studies, Sanjou-Tadzong returned to Cameroon and served as a Biology teacher. Over time he also worked as a Provincial and National Pedagogic Inspector for Biology under the Ministry of National Education. He later taught botany at the Advanced Teachers Training College (ENSA) in Bambili, part of the University of Bamenda.

=== Public service – Government Delegate for Bamenda Urban Council ===
Sanjou-Tadzong became Government Delegate (equivalent to mayor) of the then-urban council of Bamenda. According to a news report, he began his tenure following his predecessor Jomia Pefok.

Under his administration, he was credited with significant contributions to local governance and urban management in Bamenda.

He served as the Government Delegate for many years — reportedly for close to two decades — before being succeeded in 2009 by Vincent Ndumu Nji, following an administrative reshuffle.

His name also appears in documentation of municipal water-and-sanitation and urban-planning programmes coordinated with international partners while he was in office.

== Writing and memoir ==
In 2021, Sanjou-Tadzong published a memoir-style book titled *Community Stewardship*, reflecting on his personal journey, values, and life experiences — from humble beginnings in Mankon to public service and community engagement. The book outlines a worldview emphasizing virtues such as hard work, honesty, empathy, justice, respect, transparency, and communal solidarity — and rejects corruption, greed and social division.

== Personal life ==
He is married to Esther Anwi Mofor, a British-trained school and university counsellor (M.Ed.) from the University of Bristol, UK. They have children and grandchildren.

== Controversies and later life ==
In June 2012, a report from a local newspaper alleged that in early 2010, Sanjou-Tadzong had been arrested and detained at the Bamenda central prison. The arrest was reportedly linked to an audit of municipal funds — specifically a council-chamber construction project at Mulang. The sum in question was 188,466,768 FCFA. While he was later discharged, the article noted that other files remained under investigation.

A 2023 demographic study identifies him — at that time — as a retired Government Delegate of the Bamenda City Council and gives his age as 72 years.

== Bibliography ==
- Sanjou-Tadzong, Abel Ndeh. Community Stewardship. Bamenda: Langaa RPCIG, 2021.
